The 2017 World Taekwondo Grand Slam is the 1st edition of the World Taekwondo Grand Slam series.

Qualifications and seeding position 

 In case of multi qualified athlete(s) as well as withdrawal of invitation among No.1 to No. 8 seeded athletes, the higher seeding position shall be assigned to athlete as mandatory.
 No.9 to No. 12 seeding are fixed position, and replacement for No.9 to No. 11 will be decided by the rules of Qualification Tournament for Wuxi 2017 WT Grand Slam Champions Series 
 In case of multi qualified athlete(s) as well as withdrawal of invitation among No.1 to No.8 seeded athletes, following replacement rule shall apply:

Events schedule
The competition was held every saturday since 30 December 2017 to 20 January 2018.

Medal summary

The team championships were also held in the same arena but for a different competition, called the World Cup Team Championships.

Men

Women

Medal table

References

World Taekwondo Grand Slam
Grand Slam
World Taekwondo Grand Slam
International sports competitions hosted by China
Sport in Wuxi
World Taekwondo Grand Slam
World Taekwondo Grand Slam